Estádio Santiago de Compostela, commonly known as Estádio Parque Santiago, is a multi-use stadium located in Salvador, Brazil. It is used mostly for football matches and hosts the home matches of Galícia Esporte Clube. The stadium has a maximum capacity of 8,000 people.

The stadium was built with the help of the Spanish  community of Salvador.

References

External links 
 Estádio Parque Santiago

Parque Santiago
Sports venues in Salvador, Bahia